Dinara Safina was the defending champion, but lost in the quarterfinals to Shahar Pe'er.

Li Na won in the final 4–6, 6–3, 6–4, against Victoria Azarenka.

This was the final edition of the tournament. The Brisbane International was held the next year, merging the men's and women's tournaments in this city.

Seeds

  Nicole Vaidišová (quarterfinals)
  Nadia Petrova (first round)
  Dinara Safina (quarterfinals)
  Patty Schnyder (semifinals)
  Shahar Pe'er (semifinals)
  Amélie Mauresmo (quarterfinals)
  Sybille Bammer (first round)
  Ágnes Szávay (first round)

Draw

Finals

Top half

Bottom half

External links
Draw and Qualifying draw

Singles